"Hot Blooded Woman" is a song by German recording artist Vanessa Petruo. It was written by Petruo along with Niclas Lundin and Jonas Jeberg for her debut studio album Mama Lilla Would (2005), while production was helmed by OJA Tunes. The uptempo track was released by Universal Island on 4  November 2005 as the lead single from the album. Despite its critical acclaim, the song failed to reprise the commercial success of Petruo's former single "Drama Queen," reaching number 59 at the German Singles Chart.

Background and writing 
"Hot Blooded Woman" was written by Jonas Jeberg, Niclas Lundin and Vanessa Petruo herself for her unreleased album in 2004. It was initially written as a pop song, and was named "What the Hell Is This?". However, that album was not released, and the song was rewritten and composed in more latin pop and soul style. "What the Hell Is This?" eventually became one of the lines of a new song, renamed "Hot Blooded Woman". The song was decided to be the lead single for Mama Lilla Would, the debut album by Petruo, released in 2005.

Track listings

Charts

References

External links 
 "Hot Blooded Woman" at the YouTube
 "Hot Blooded Woman" at the Amazon.com

2005 songs
2005 singles
Vanessa Petruo songs
Songs written by Jonas Jeberg